VA-22A was an Attack Squadron of the U.S. Navy, established as Torpedo Squadron VT-98 on 28 August 1944 at NAAS Ventura (Oxnard). It moved to NAAS Los Alamitos on 1 December 1944, and to NAS San Diego on 25 August 1946. The squadron was redesignated VA-22A on 15 November 1946. It was disestablished on 5 August 1947.

The squadron's motto was Parati—in Pace—Aut Bello (Prepared—in Peace—or War). It flew various models of the Grumman TBF Avenger, and its mission throughout its life was to provide trained torpedo plane pilots and aircrewmen for assignment as replacements to squadrons operating in the Pacific.

See also
 Attack aircraft
 History of the United States Navy
 List of inactive United States Navy aircraft squadrons

References

Attack squadrons of the United States Navy
Wikipedia articles incorporating text from the Dictionary of American Naval Aviation Squadrons